Stockholm Radio is the only remaining coast radio station in Sweden. It was established as Stavsnäs Radio in 1937.  The station is located at Karlavägen in Stockholm. While the infrastructure is owned by the Swedish Maritime Administration, Stockholm Radio is private and operated by Viamare. The Areo Radio service is run since 2003 by Aviolinx.

References

External links
 Official website 

Coast radio stations
Water transport in Sweden
1937 establishments in Sweden